Yavesía Zapotec, also known as Southeastern Ixtlán Zapotec (Zapoteco del Sureste de Ixtlán) and Latuvi Zapotec, is a Zapotec language of Oaxaca, Mexico.

References

Zapotec languages